Croatia competed at the 2015 World Aquatics Championships in Kazan, Russia from 24 July to 9 August 2015.

Medalists

Diving

Croatian divers qualified for the individual spots and synchronized teams at the World Championships.

Women

Open water swimming

Croatia has qualified two swimmers to compete in the open water marathon.

Swimming

Croatian swimmers have achieved qualifying standards in the following events (up to a maximum of 2 swimmers in each event at the A-standard entry time, and 1 at the B-standard):

Men

Women

Synchronized swimming

Croatia has qualified two synchronized swimmers to compete in each of the following events.

Water polo

Men's tournament

Team roster

Josip Pavić
Damir Burić
Antonio Petković
Luka Lončar
Maro Joković
Luka Bukić
Petar Muslim
Andro Bušlje
Sandro Sukno
Fran Paškvalin
Anđelo Šetka
Paulo Obradović
Marko Bijač

Group play

Quarterfinals

Semifinals

Final

References

External links
Croatian Swimming Federation 

Nations at the 2015 World Aquatics Championships
2015 in Croatian sport
Croatia at the World Aquatics Championships